Reedy Branch is a  long 1st order tributary to the Trent River in Craven County, North Carolina.  This stream forms the boundary of Jones and Craven Counties for a large portion of its length.

Course
Reedy Branch rises about 3 miles south of Timothy Chapel, North Carolina in Croatan National Forest and then flows north to join the Trent River across from Trent Woods.

Watershed
Reedy Branch drains  of area, receives about 54.9 in/year of precipitation, has a wetness index of 583.01, and is about 23% forested.

See also
List of rivers of North Carolina

References

Rivers of North Carolina
Rivers of Craven County, North Carolina
Rivers of Jones County, North Carolina